This is a list of fellows of the Royal Society elected in 2009.

Fellows 

Robert Anthony Ainsworth
Ross J. Anderson
Michael Norman Royston Ashfold
Michael Batty
Martin Buck
Oscar Peter Buneman
Michel Crétien
Jennifer Alice Clack
Michael James Duff
R. Keith Ellis
Jeffrey Graham Ellis
James Kazimierz Gimzewski
David Moore Glover
Christopher Carl Goodnow
Wendy Hall
Nicholas Paul Harberd
John Hardy
Brian Arthur Hemmings
Christine Holt
Christopher Neil Hunter
Graham Hutchings
Peter Gershon Isaacson
Jonathan Peter Keating
Dimitris Kioussis
Stephen Richard Larter
David Alan Leigh
David J. C. MacKay
Arthur B. McDonald
Angela Ruth McLean
David Roger Jones Owen
Richard Edward Passingham
Guy Peel Richardson
Wolfram Schultz
Keith Shine
Henning Sirringhaus
Maurice S Skolnick
Karen Steel
Malcolm Francis Graham Stevens
Jesper Qualmann Svejstrup
Jonathan Tennyson
John Andrew Todd
Burt James Totaro
John Christopher Vederas
John Nicholas Wood

Foreign members

John Paul Holdren
Howard Robert Horvitz
Thomas Kailath
Roger D Kornberg
Yakov G Sinai
Joseph Stiglitz
Rashid A Sunyaev
Steven D. Tanksley

Royal fellows
The Prince of Wales, then Prince William of Wales

References

2009
2009 in science
2009 in the United Kingdom